The 1995 Purolator 500 was the fourth stock car race of the 1995 NASCAR Winston Cup Series and the 36th iteration of the event. The race was held on Saturday, March 12, 1995, in Hampton, Georgia at Atlanta Motor Speedway, a  permanent asphalt quad-oval intermediate speedway. The race took the scheduled 328 laps to complete. At race's end, Hendrick Motorsports driver Jeff Gordon would manage to dominate the majority of the race to take his fourth career NASCAR Winston Cup Series victory and his second victory of the season. To fill out the top three, Joe Gibbs Racing driver Bobby Labonte and Hendrick Motorsports driver Terry Labonte would finish second and third, respectively.

Background 

Atlanta Motor Speedway (formerly Atlanta International Raceway) is a 1.522-mile race track in Hampton, Georgia, United States, 20 miles (32 km) south of Atlanta. It has annually hosted NASCAR Winston Cup Series stock car races since its inauguration in 1960.

The venue was bought by Speedway Motorsports in 1990. In 1994, 46 condominiums were built over the northeastern side of the track. In 1997, to standardize the track with Speedway Motorsports' other two intermediate ovals, the entire track was almost completely rebuilt. The project made the track one of the fastest on the NASCAR circuit.

Entry list 
 (R) - denotes rookie driver.

Qualifying 
Qualifying was split into two rounds. The first round was held on Friday, March 10, at 12:30 PM EST. Each driver would have one lap to set a time. During the first round, the top 20 drivers in the round would be guaranteed a starting spot in the race. If a driver was not able to guarantee a spot in the first round, they had the option to scrub their time from the first round and try and run a faster lap time in a second round qualifying run, held on Saturday, March 11, at 11:00 AM EST. As with the first round, each driver would have one lap to set a time. For this specific race, positions 21-38 would be decided on time, and depending on who needed it, a select amount of positions were given to cars who had not otherwise qualified but were high enough in owner's points; up to four provisionals were given. If needed, a past champion who did not qualify on either time or provisionals could use a champion's provisional, adding one more spot to the field.

Eight cars would fail to qualify.

Full qualifying results

Race results

References 

Purolator 500
NASCAR races at Atlanta Motor Speedway
1995 in sports in Georgia (U.S. state)